Chicago Board of Trade II is a colour photograph by German artist Andreas Gursky made in 1999. It was created following his usual process of taking several pictures of the same subject and then manipulating and merging the scanned results by computer.

Description and analysis
The picture of large dimensions (157,4 by 284 cm) presents the floor of the Board of Trade, in Chicago, where a large number of brokers, of different jacket colours, are seen in groups around several banks of monitors. The image is deliberately blurred. Gursky achieved the sense of movement by using the double exposure of several sections of the picture.
The overall pattern seems reminiscent of the abstract expressionist painting, in particular of Jackson Pollock.

A new version of the picture, Chicago, Board of Trade III (1999-2009) would be sold by $3,298,755 at Sotheby's, London, on 26 June 2013.

Public collections
This picture had a six copies edition, two of which are at the Tate Modern, in London. There are also prints at the Kunstmuseum, in Bonn, and at the Museum of Contemporary Art, in Chicago.

References

Color photographs
Photographs by Andreas Gursky
1999 works
1999 in art
1990s photographs
Photographs of the Tate galleries